The 2019 World Shotgun Championships were held from 30 June to 11 July 2019 in Lonato del Garda, Italy. As in all odd-numbered years, separate ISSF World Shooting Championships are held for trap, double trap and skeet events.

Competition schedule
The competition schedule was as follows:

Senior medalists

Men

Women

Mixed

Junior medalists

Men

Women

Mixed

Event status
 Due to a lack of participation, certain disciplines were classed as Grand Prix events and do not count towards medal standings.

Medal tables

Seniors

Juniors

References

ISSF World Shooting Championships
World Shotgun Championships
Shooting
2019 in Italian sport
Shooting competitions in Italy
July 2019 sports events in Italy